Cholfirst Radio Tower is a  lattice tower on Cholfirst Mountain at Flurlingen, Canton of Zurich, Switzerland.

The tower was built in 1973 by PTT on Cholfirst Mountain, a  mountain near Flurlingen after 3 years of successful operation of an experimental TV transmitter on channel 47 on a  tower nearby. The construction of Cholfirst Radio Tower cost 7 million Swiss Francs. On request of Flurlingen community it was equipped with an observation deck, accessible for tourists by stairway (no elevator) in a height of 42 metres, of which additional costs were paid by PTT.

Transmitted programmes

External links
 https://web.archive.org/web/20070702124426/http://www.flurlingen.ch/Information_Antennenturm.htm
 

Towers in Switzerland
1973 establishments in Switzerland
Buildings and structures in the canton of Zürich
Towers completed in 1973
20th-century architecture in Switzerland